Silje Wergeland (born 9 November 1974) is a Norwegian singer, songwriter and pianist. She is best known as the current lead vocalist of the Dutch progressive/alternative rock band The Gathering (since 2009). She was also the frontwoman of Norwegian doom/gothic metal band Octavia Sperati.

Musical career 
Silje Wergeland was a founding member of the female group of gothic / doom metal Octavia Sperati in 2000, where she remained as vocalist and one of the main songwriters along with Gyri Losnegaard and Bodil Myklebust, until 2008. In an interview with Paul Stenning, Wergeland described the band as “Extravagant, dramatic doom with a rock n’ roll heart.” She also said her influences were “Black Sabbath, Slayer, Clutch, Pantera, Type O Negative, Pink Floyd among others, and also some Norwegian folk music influences due to our musical inheritance.”

On 10 March 2009 it was announced that singer Wergeland joined Dutch rock band The Gathering, replacing singer Anneke van Giersbergen, who left to form her own band Agua de Annique.

Her first studio album with The Gathering, The West Pole was released in May 2009.

Personal life 
Wergeland was born in Bergen, where she still regularly lives. Her partner is Mads Lilletvedt, drummer of the death / thrash metal local band Hellish Outcast and Sahg. They are the parents of two girls: Marie, born in August 2012 and Louise, born in February 2016.

Discography

With Octavia Sperati 
 Guilty (demo, (2002)
 Winter Enclosure (2005)
 ...and Then the World Froze (single, 2007)
 Grace Submerged (2007)

With The Gathering
The West Pole (2009)
City from Above (EP, 2009)
Heroes for Ghosts (Single, 2011)
Meltdown (Single, 2012)
Disclosure (2012)
Afterlights (EP, 2012)
Echoes Keep Growing (Single, 2013)
Afterwords (2013)
Beautiful Distortion (2022)

References

External links 
  
 Silje Wergeland at Discogs
 Silje Wergeland at Metallum Archives

1974 births
Living people
Women heavy metal singers
Norwegian heavy metal singers
Norwegian sopranos
People from Hordaland
21st-century Norwegian singers
21st-century Norwegian women singers